Agat Films & Cie – Ex Nihilo is a French production company and film distributor.

The company groups the following eight producers: Robert Guédiguian, Blanche Guichou, Marie Balducchi, Nicolas Blanc, Marc Bordure, Arnaud Colinart, David Coujard, Muriel Meynard, and Patrick Sobelman. The company is chaired alternately by each of the eight partners.

Selected filmography

Films

TV series 
2005: Venus and Apollo
2016: Tu mourras moins bête
2013: La langue secrète des marionnettes

Video games 
2013: Type:Rider

References

External links
 Official website

Film production companies of France
Film distributors of France